Lobelia telekii is a species of flowering plant in the family Campanulaceae, that is found only in the alpine zones of Mount Kenya, Mount Elgon, and the Aberdare Mountains of East Africa. It occurs at higher altitudes on well-drained sloped hillsides. Inflorescences of L. telekii also possesses a large pith-volume for internal water storage and marcescent foliage which could provide insulation. It secretes a polysaccharide into this reservoir, which may be useful for its survival in the cold climate. 
 The plant is named after the Austro-Hungarian explorer, Count Sámuel Teleki.

L. telekii plants usually consist of a single rosette, which grows for several decades, flowers once, and then dies.  However, a very small number of plants have multiple rosettes connected by an underground stem.  Each flower is subtended by a long hairy bract, and the overall appearance has led to the nickname "Cousin Itt lobelia".

The bird-pollinated flowers of L. telekii are hidden among the large bracts within the inflorescence. The leaves and bracts are blue-green, and the flowers purple.  Each flower can produce up to several hundred small (<1mm diameter) dark seeds, which are passively dispersed.
It inhabits the drier hill slopes, while its close relative Lobelia keniensis prefers the moister valley bottoms. Partially fertile hybrids do occur. The hill slopes often have rocky moraines that are home to Mount Kenya rock hyrax, which sometimes eat lobelia leaves and inflorescences, but herbivores are generally deterred by the lobelia's bitter toxic sap, which contains alkaloids, probably including lobeline.

Taxonomy   

Lobelia telekii was previously classified under the Rhynchopetalum section within the Tupa subgenus. The genus has since been reconfigured so that Tupa and Rhynchopetalum are separate sections, with L. telekii falling into the latter. Tupa and Rhynchopetalum are separated by their difference in chromosome count and geographic distribution, supported by morphological differences.

References

External links
 

telekii
Flora of Africa
Afromontane flora